

Garth Alan Gibson is a computer scientist from Carnegie Mellon University. Gibson's developed the RAID taxonomy of redundant data storage systems, along with David A. Patterson and Randy Katz.

Born in Aurora, Ontario, he holds a Ph.D. and an MSc in computer science from the University of California, Berkeley, and a B.Math in computer science from the University of Waterloo. He was involved in informed prefetch computing and network-attached secure disks, a precursor to the SCSI object storage device command set.  Gibson was the initial director of the Parallel Data Laboratory at Carnegie Mellon University, and founder and chief technology officer for Panasas, a computer data storage hardware and software company. Gibson was the first president and chief executive officer of the Vector Institute.

In 2005 he became the 11th awardee of the J.W. Graham Medal, named in honor of Wes Graham an early influential professor of computer science at the University of Waterloo, and annually awarded to an alumnus of the university's Faculty of Mathematics.

See also
 List of University of Waterloo people

References

External links
 Garth Gibson, biography - Carnegie Mellon School of Computer Science
 Panasas
 Parallel Data Lab

People from Aurora, Ontario
Computer systems researchers
Living people
Year of birth missing (living people)
University of Waterloo alumni
Carnegie Mellon University faculty
American chief technology officers
J.W. Graham Medal awardees